The Nine Stones (or Altarnun stone circle) is a stone circle  south southeast of Altarnun,  west of Launceston on Bodmin Moor in Cornwall, UK.

Description
The Nine Stones is an English Heritage managed property. It was restored in 1889 when only two stones remained standing. The circle is the smallest on Bodmin Moor, only  in diameter with eight granite stones forming the circle and one in the centre. A flat triangular-shaped stone also lies at the base of one of the stones. The stones are irregularly spaced with the tallest being . A gap in the north suggests where a stone may have stood. The central stone, a granite post 1.1 metres high, may have been moved from the north part of the circle to be used as a boundary stone for the parish boundary.

Archaeology
There are hut circles  to the northeast and another to the south.

Alignments
Alexander Thom proposed a lunar alignment with a nearby stone row which leads towards some cairns, although this has been considered doubtful as the row is likely of medieval construction.

Literature

References

External links

 Pastscape - Nine Stones Stone Circle
 Illustrated entry in the Megalithic Portal

Bodmin Moor
Stone circles in Cornwall